The Chaqchan Mosque (meaning “The Miraculous Mosque”) is a mosque in the city of Khaplu, in the Gilgit-Baltistan region of northern Pakistan. Dating from 1370, the mosque is one of the oldest in the region, and dates from the time when the area's populace converted en masse from Buddhism to Islam. The mosque shares similar architecture as those built in the Kashmir Valley. It is a perfect blend of Tibetan, Mughal and Persian style of architecture.

History
According to some sources the mosque was built by Mir Sayyid Ali Hamadani while other say on arrival of Sufi saint Syed Nurbakhsh from Kashmir to Baltistan, the local ruling Raja accepted Islam and commissioned the building of the mosque in 1370 CE. However, the dating of the latter theory contradicts historical source which suggests that the mosque was actually constructed more than two decade before the birth of Syed Nurbakhsh.

Conservation
The Government of Pakistan has listed the Chaqchan Mosque as a Pakistan Heritage Site. The mosque is now currently in use after extensive conservation works.

Architecture
Architecturally, the mosque is a perfect blend of Tibetan, Mughal and Persian styles, and consists of a two-story cubic complex: Semi-basement, ground floor with a turret atop. The perimetral walls of the cubic structure are composed of wooden slabs stacked to form a frame with its void spaces daubed with clay or mud that is in fact this technology is similar to the Roman opus craticum technique. This method of construction is one of the oldest known for making a weatherproof structures and it is also suitable for harsh winter conditions.

Gallery

See also
 Amburik Mosque
 Khilingrong Mosque

References

Tibetan architecture
History of Baltistan
Mosques in Gilgit-Baltistan
mosques  completed in 1370